Horní Bludovice is a municipality and village in Karviná District in the Moravian-Silesian Region of the Czech Republic. It has about 2,500 inhabitants.

Administrative parts
The village of Prostřední Bludovice is an administrative part of Horní Bludovice.

Geography
Horní Bludovice lies in the historical region of Cieszyn Silesia. The Lučina River flows through the municipality. It is located mostly in the Moravian-Silesian Foothills, Prostřední Bludovice extends into the Ostrava Basin lowland.

History
The village of Bludovice (which was later known as Dolní Bludovice) was first mentioned in 1335. The division to Horní and Dolní Bludovice (Lower and Upper Bludovice) developed in the 15th century.

Politically the village belonged then to the Duchy of Teschen within the Kingdom of Bohemia, which after 1526 became part of the Habsburg monarchy.

References

External links

Villages in Karviná District
Cieszyn Silesia